The episodes of the anime series A Little Snow Fairy Sugar were created by "Project Sugar"—a collaboration between TBS, J.C.Staff, and Kadokawa Shoten—and directed by Shinichiro Kimura. The first episode premiered in Japan on TBS on October 2, 2001, and the series ran for 24 episodes until its conclusion on March 26, 2002. A two episode original video animation was released for the series. Set four years after the conclusion of the series, Saga tells Kanon about a school play in which she played the princess and struggled with stage fright, while Sugar and other fairies decide to make a play of their own.

The anime series uses three pieces of theme music. "Sugar Baby Love" by Yoko Ishida is used for the opening theme for all of the episodes except the first and the last, which use no opening. It is also used for the ending theme for the last episode. Maria Yamamoto's performance of the song "Snow Flower" is used for the ending theme for the first 23 episodes.


Episode listing

A Little Snow Fairy Sugar

A Little Snow Fairy Sugar Special

References

External links
Official JC Staff A Little Snow Fairy Sugar anime website 

Little Snow Fairy Sugar, A